David William Donald Cameron (born 9 October 1966) is a former British politician who served as Prime Minister of the United Kingdom from 2010 to 2016 and Leader of the Conservative Party from 2005 to 2016. He previously served as Leader of the Opposition from 2005 to 2010, and was Member of Parliament (MP) for Witney from 2001 to 2016. He identifies as a one-nation conservative, and has been associated with both economically liberal and socially liberal policies.

Born in London to an upper-middle-class family, Cameron was educated at Heatherdown School, Eton College, and Brasenose College, Oxford. From 1988 to 1993 he worked at the Conservative Research Department, latterly assisting the Conservative Prime Minister John Major, before leaving politics to work for Carlton Communications in 1994. Becoming an MP in 2001, he served in the opposition shadow cabinet under Conservative leader Michael Howard, and succeeded Howard in 2005. Cameron sought to rebrand the Conservatives, embracing an increasingly socially liberal position, and introducing the "A-List" to increase the number of female and minority ethnic Conservative MPs.

Following the 2010 general election, negotiations led to Cameron becoming prime minister as the head of a coalition government with the Liberal Democrats. His premiership was marked by the ongoing effects of the global financial crisis; these involved a large deficit in government finances that his government sought to reduce through austerity measures. His administration passed the Health and Social Care Act and the Welfare Reform Act, which introduced large-scale changes to healthcare and welfare. It also enforced stricter immigration policies, introduced reforms to education and oversaw the 2012 London Olympics. It privatised the Royal Mail and some other state assets, and legalised same-sex marriage in England and Wales.

Internationally, Cameron's government intervened militarily in the First Libyan Civil War and authorised the bombing of the Islamic State. Domestically, his government oversaw the referendum on voting reform and Scottish independence referendum, both of which confirmed Cameron's favoured outcome. When the Conservatives secured an unexpected majority in the 2015 general election, he remained as prime minister, this time leading a Conservative-only government. To fulfil a manifesto pledge, Cameron introduced a referendum on the UK's continuing membership of the EU in 2016. He supported the Britain Stronger in Europe campaign for the UK to remain in the European Union. Following the success of the Leave vote, Cameron resigned as prime minister and was succeeded by Theresa May, his home secretary. He has been the president of Alzheimer's Research UK since 2017.

Cameron has been praised for modernising the Conservative Party and for decreasing the United Kingdom's national deficit. However, he has been criticised for his decision to hold the referendum on Britain's membership of the EU, which led to political instability in the UK during the late 2010s. After leaving office, he was implicated in the Greensill scandal after lobbying government ministers and civil servants on behalf of Greensill Capital.

Early life and career

Early family life

David William Donald Cameron was born on 9 October 1966 in Marylebone, London, and raised at Peasemore in Berkshire. He has a brother, Alexander Cameron KC (born 1963), a barrister, and two sisters. He is the younger son of Ian Donald Cameron (1932–2010) a stockbroker, and his wife Mary Fleur, a retired Justice of the Peace and a daughter of Sir William Mount, 2nd Baronet.

Cameron's father, Ian, was born at Blairmore House near Huntly, Aberdeenshire, and died near Toulon, France, on 8 September 2010; Ian was born with both legs deformed, and underwent repeated operations to correct this. Blairmore was built by Cameron's great-great-grandfather, Alexander Geddes, who had made a fortune in the grain trade in Chicago, Illinois, before returning to Scotland in the 1880s. Blairmore was sold soon after Ian's birth.

Cameron has said, "On my mother's side of the family, her mother was a Llewellyn, so Welsh. I'm a real mixture of Scottish, Welsh, and English." He has also referenced the German Jewish ancestry of one of his great-grandfathers, Arthur Levita, a descendant of the Yiddish author Elia Levita.

Education
From the age of seven, Cameron was educated at two private schools: at Heatherdown School in Winkfield (near Ascot) in Berkshire, which counts Prince Andrew and Prince Edward among its old boys. Owing to good grades, he entered its top academic class almost two years early. At the age of 13 he went on to Eton College in Berkshire, following his father and elder brother. His early interest was in art. Six weeks before taking his O-Levels, he was caught smoking cannabis. He admitted the offence and had not been involved in selling drugs, so he was not expelled; instead he was fined, prevented from leaving the school grounds, and given a "Georgic" (a punishment that involved copying 500 lines of Latin text).

Cameron passed twelve O-Levels and then three A-levels: History of art; History, in which he was taught by Michael Kidson; and Economics with Politics. He obtained three 'A' grades and a '1' grade in the Scholarship Level exam in Economics and Politics. The following autumn, he passed the entrance exam for the University of Oxford, and was offered an exhibition at Brasenose College.

After leaving Eton in 1984, Cameron started a nine-month gap year. For three months he worked as a researcher for his godfather Tim Rathbone, then Conservative MP for Lewes, during which time he attended debates in the House of Commons. Through his father, he was then employed for a further three months in Hong Kong by Jardine Matheson as a 'ship jumper', an administrative post.

Returning from Hong Kong, Cameron visited the then-Soviet Union, where he was approached by two Russian men speaking fluent English. He was later told by one of his professors that it was "definitely an attempt" by the KGB to recruit him.

In October 1985, Cameron began his Bachelor of Arts course in Philosophy, Politics and Economics (PPE) at Brasenose College, Oxford. His tutor, Vernon Bogdanor, has described him as "one of the ablest" students he has taught, with "moderate and sensible Conservative" political views.

Guy Spier, who shared tutorials with him, remembers him as an outstanding student: "We were doing our best to grasp basic economic concepts. David—there was nobody else who came even close. He would be integrating them with the way the British political system is put together. He could have lectured me on it, and I would have sat there and taken notes." When commenting in 2006 on his former pupil's ideas about a "Bill of Rights" to replace the Human Rights Act, however, Bogdanor, himself a Liberal Democrat, said, "I think he is very confused. I've read his speech and it's filled with contradictions. There are one or two good things in it but one glimpses them, as it were, through a mist of misunderstanding".

While at Oxford, Cameron was a member of the Bullingdon Club, an exclusive student dining society that has a reputation for an outlandish drinking culture associated with boisterous behaviour and damaging property. In his 2019 memoir Cameron wrote about being a member of the Bullingdon and its impact on his political career, saying: "When I look now at the much-reproduced photograph taken of our group of appallingly over-self-confident ‘sons of privilege’, I cringe. If I had known at the time the grief I would get for that picture, of course I would never have joined. But life isn't like that...“These were also the years after the ITV adaptation of Brideshead Revisited when quite a few of us were carried away by the fantasy of an Evelyn Waugh-like Oxford existence. Cameron's period in the Bullingdon Club was examined in a 2009 Channel 4 docu-drama, When Boris Met Dave, the title referring to Boris Johnson, another high-profile Conservative party figure, who was then Mayor of London at the time of the film had been a member at the same time and who would go on to be Prime Minister himself years later.

Cameron graduated in 1988 with a first-class honours BA degree (later promoted to an MA by seniority).

Early political career

Conservative Research Department
After graduation, Cameron worked for the Conservative Research Department between September 1988 and 1993. His first brief was Trade and Industry, Energy and Privatisation; he befriended fellow young colleagues, including Edward Llewellyn, Ed Vaizey and Rachel Whetstone. They and others formed a group they called the "Smith Square set", which was dubbed the "Brat Pack" by the press, though it is better known as the "Notting Hill set", a name given to it pejoratively by Derek Conway. In 1991, Cameron was seconded to Downing Street to work on briefing John Major for the then twice-weekly sessions of Prime Minister's Questions. One newspaper gave Cameron the credit for "sharper ... Despatch box performances" by Major, which included highlighting for Major "a dreadful piece of doublespeak" by Tony Blair (then the Labour Employment spokesman) over the effect of a national minimum wage. He became head of the political section of the Conservative Research Department, and in August 1991 was tipped to follow Judith Chaplin as political secretary to the prime minister.

However, Cameron lost to Jonathan Hill, who was appointed in March 1992. Instead, Cameron was given the responsibility for briefing Major for his press conferences during the 1992 general election. During the campaign, Cameron was one of the young "brat pack" of party strategists who worked between 12 and 20 hours a day, sleeping in the house of Alan Duncan in Gayfere Street, Westminster, which had been Major's campaign headquarters during his bid for the Conservative leadership. Cameron headed the economic section; it was while working on this campaign that Cameron first worked closely with and befriended Steve Hilton, who was later to become Director of Strategy during his party leadership. The strain of getting up at 04:45 every day was reported to have led Cameron to decide to leave politics in favour of journalism.

Special Adviser to the Chancellor
The Conservatives' unexpected success in the 1992 election led Cameron to hit back at older party members who had criticised him and his colleagues, saying "whatever people say about us, we got the campaign right", and that they had listened to their campaign workers on the ground rather than the newspapers. He revealed he had led other members of the team across Smith Square to jeer at Transport House, the former Labour headquarters. Cameron was rewarded with a promotion to Special Adviser to the Chancellor of the Exchequer, Norman Lamont.

Cameron was working for Lamont at the time of Black Wednesday, when pressure from currency speculators forced the pound sterling out of the European Exchange Rate Mechanism. At the 1992 Conservative Party conference, Cameron had difficulty trying to arrange to brief the speakers in the economic debate, having to resort to putting messages on the internal television system imploring the mover of the motion, Patricia Morris, to contact him. Later that month, Cameron joined a delegation of Special Advisers who visited Germany to build better relations with the Christian Democratic Union; he was reported to be "still smarting" over the Bundesbank's contribution to the economic crisis.

Lamont fell out with John Major after Black Wednesday and became highly unpopular with the public. Taxes needed to be raised in the 1993 Budget, and Cameron fed the options Lamont was considering through to Conservative Campaign Headquarters for their political acceptability to be assessed. By May 1993, the Conservatives' average poll rating dropped below 30%, where they would remain until the 1997 general election. Major and Lamont's personal ratings also declined dramatically. However, Lamont's unpopularity did not necessarily affect Cameron, who was considered as a potential "kamikaze" candidate for the Newbury by-election, which includes the area where he grew up. However, he decided not to stand.

During the by-election, Lamont gave the response "Je ne regrette rien" to a question about whether he most regretted claiming to see "the green shoots of recovery" or admitting to "singing in his bath" with happiness at leaving the European Exchange Rate Mechanism. Cameron was identified by one journalist as having inspired this gaffe; it was speculated that the heavy Conservative defeat in Newbury may have cost Cameron his chance of becoming Chancellor himself, even though as he was not a Member of Parliament he could not have been. Lamont was sacked at the end of May 1993, and decided not to write the usual letter of resignation; Cameron was given the responsibility to issue to the press a statement of self-justification.

Special Adviser to the Home Secretary

After Lamont was sacked, Cameron remained at the Treasury for less than a month before being specifically recruited by Home Secretary Michael Howard. It was commented that he was still "very much in favour" and it was later reported that many at the Treasury would have preferred Cameron to carry on. At the beginning of September 1993, Cameron applied to go on Conservative Central Office's list of prospective parliamentary candidates (PPCs).

Cameron was much more socially liberal than Howard but enjoyed working for him. According to Derek Lewis, then Director-General of Her Majesty's Prison Service, Cameron showed him a "his and her list" of proposals made by Howard and his wife, Sandra. Lewis said that Sandra Howard's list included reducing the quality of prison food, although she denied this claim. Lewis reported that Cameron was "uncomfortable" about the list. In defending Sandra Howard and insisting that she made no such proposal, the journalist Bruce Anderson wrote that Cameron had proposed a much shorter definition on prison catering which revolved around the phrase "balanced diet", and that Lewis had written thanking Cameron for a valuable contribution.

During his work for Howard, Cameron often briefed the media. In March 1994, someone leaked to the press that the Labour Party had called for a meeting with John Major to discuss a consensus on the Prevention of Terrorism Act. After an inquiry failed to find the source of the leak, Labour MP Peter Mandelson demanded assurance from Howard that Cameron had not been responsible, which Howard gave. A senior Home Office civil servant noted the influence of Howard's Special Advisers, saying previous incumbents "would listen to the evidence before making a decision. Howard just talks to young public school gentlemen from the party headquarters."

Carlton
In July 1994, Cameron left his role as Special Adviser to work as the Director of Corporate Affairs at Carlton Communications. Carlton, which had won the ITV franchise for London weekdays in 1991, was a growing media company which also had film-distribution and video-producing arms. Cameron was suggested for the role to Carlton executive chairman Michael P. Green by his later mother-in-law Lady Astor. Cameron left Carlton to run for Parliament in 1997, returning to his job after his defeat.

In 1997, Cameron played up the company's prospects for digital terrestrial television, for which it joined with ITV Granada and Sky to form British Digital Broadcasting. In a roundtable discussion on the future of broadcasting in 1998 he criticised the effect of overlapping different regulators on the industry. Carlton's consortium did win the digital terrestrial franchise but the resulting company suffered difficulties in attracting subscribers. Cameron resigned as Director of Corporate Affairs in February 2001 in order to run for Parliament for a second time, although he remained on the payroll as a consultant.

Parliamentary candidacies

Having been approved for the PPCs' list, Cameron began looking for a seat to contest for the 1997 general election. He was reported to have missed out on selection for Ashford in December 1994, after failing to get to the selection meeting as a result of train delays. In January 1996, when two shortlisted contenders dropped out, Cameron was interviewed and subsequently selected for Stafford, a constituency revised in boundary changes, which was projected to have a Conservative majority. The incumbent Conservative MP, Bill Cash, ran instead in the neighbouring constituency of Stone, where he was re-elected. At the 1996 Conservative Party Conference, Cameron called for tax cuts in the forthcoming Budget to be targeted at the low-paid and to "small businesses where people took money out of their own pockets to put into companies to keep them going". He also said the Party "should be proud of the Tory tax record but that people needed reminding of its achievements ... It's time to return to our tax-cutting agenda. The socialist prime ministers of Europe have endorsed Tony Blair because they want a federal pussy cat and not a British lion."

When writing his election address, Cameron made his own opposition to British membership of the single European currency clear, pledging not to support it. This was a break with official Conservative policy but about 200 other candidates were making similar declarations. Otherwise, Cameron kept closely to the national party line. He also campaigned using the claim that a Labour government would increase the cost of a pint of beer by 24p; however, the Labour candidate, David Kidney, portrayed Cameron as "a right-wing Tory". Initially Cameron thought he had a 50/50 chance, but as the campaign wore on and the scale of the impending Conservative defeat grew, Cameron prepared himself for defeat. On election day, Stafford had a swing of 10.7%, almost the same as the national swing, which made it one of the many seats to fall to Labour: Kidney defeated Cameron by 24,606 votes (47.5%) to 20,292 (39.2%), a majority of 4,314 (8.3%).

In the round of selection contests taking place in the run-up to the 2001 general election, Cameron again attempted to be selected for a winnable seat. He tried for the Kensington and Chelsea seat after the death of Alan Clark, but did not make the shortlist. He was in the final two but narrowly lost at Wealden in March 2000, a loss ascribed by Samantha Cameron to his lack of spontaneity when speaking.

On 4 April 2000, Cameron was selected as PPC for Witney in Oxfordshire. This had been a safe Conservative seat, but its sitting MP Shaun Woodward (who had worked with Cameron on the 1992 election campaign) had "crossed the floor" to join the Labour Party and was selected instead for the safe Labour seat of St Helens South. Cameron's biographers Francis Elliott and James Hanning describe the two men as being "on fairly friendly terms". Cameron, advised in his strategy by friend Catherine Fall, put a great deal of effort into "nursing" his potential constituency, turning up at social functions, and attacking Woodward for changing his mind on fox hunting to support a ban.

During the election campaign, Cameron accepted the offer of writing a regular column for The Guardians online section. He won the seat with a 1.9% swing to the Conservatives, taking 22,153 votes (45%) to Labour candidate Michael Bartlet's 14,180 (28.8%), a majority of 7,973 (16.2%).

In office

Member of Parliament, 2001–2005
Upon his election to Parliament, he served as a member of the Commons Home Affairs Select Committee, a prominent appointment for a newly elected MP. Cameron proposed that the Committee launch an inquiry into the law on drugs, and urged the consideration of "radical options". The report recommended a downgrading of ecstasy from Class A to Class B, as well as moves towards a policy of 'harm reduction', which Cameron defended.

Cameron endorsed Iain Duncan Smith in the 2001 Conservative Party leadership election and organised an event in Witney for party supporters to hear John Bercow speaking for him. Two days before Duncan Smith won the leadership contest on 13 September 2001, the 9/11 attacks occurred. Cameron described Tony Blair's response to the attacks as "masterful", saying "He moved fast, and set the agenda both at home and abroad. He correctly identified the problem of Islamist extremism, the inadequacy of our response both domestically and internationally, and supported – quite rightly in my view – the action to remove the Taliban regime from Afghanistan."

Cameron determinedly attempted to increase his public visibility, offering quotations on matters of public controversy. He opposed the payment of compensation to Gurbux Singh, who had resigned as head of the Commission for Racial Equality after a confrontation with the police; and commented that the Home Affairs Select Committee had taken a long time to discuss whether the phrase "black market" should be used. However, he was passed over for a front-bench promotion in July 2002; Conservative leader Iain Duncan Smith did invite Cameron and his ally George Osborne to coach him on Prime Minister's Questions in November 2002. The next week, Cameron deliberately abstained in a vote on allowing same-sex and unmarried couples to adopt children jointly, against a whip to oppose; his abstention was noted. The wide scale of abstentions and rebellious votes destabilised the Duncan Smith leadership.

In June 2003, Cameron was appointed a shadow minister in the Privy Council Office as a deputy to Eric Forth, then Shadow Leader of the House. He also became a vice-chairman of the Conservative Party when Michael Howard took over the leadership in November of that year. He was appointed Opposition frontbench local government spokesman in 2004, before being promoted to the Shadow Cabinet that June as head of policy co-ordination. Later, he became Shadow Education Secretary in the post-election reshuffle.

Daniel Finkelstein has said of the period leading up to Cameron's election as leader of the Conservative party that "a small group of us (myself, David Cameron, George Osborne, Michael Gove, Nick Boles, Nick Herbert I think, once or twice) used to meet up in the offices of Policy Exchange, eat pizza, and consider the future of the Conservative Party". Cameron's relationship with Osborne is regarded as particularly close; Conservative MP Nadhim Zahawi suggested the closeness of Osborne's relationship with Cameron meant the two effectively shared power during Cameron's time as prime minister.

From February 2002 to August 2005 he was a non-executive director of Urbium PLC, operator of the Tiger Tiger bar chain.

Conservative Party leadership

2005 leadership election

Following the Labour victory in the May 2005 general election, Michael Howard announced his resignation as leader of the Conservative Party and set a lengthy timetable for the leadership election. Cameron announced on 29 September 2005 that he would be a candidate. Parliamentary colleagues supporting him included Boris Johnson, Shadow Chancellor George Osborne, Shadow Defence Secretary and deputy leader of the party Michael Ancram, Oliver Letwin and former party leader William Hague. His campaign did not gain wide support until his speech, delivered without notes, at the 2005 Conservative party conference. In the speech he vowed to make people "feel good about being Conservatives again" and said he wanted "to switch on a whole new generation." His speech was well-received; The Daily Telegraph said speaking without notes "showed a sureness and a confidence that is greatly to his credit".

In the first ballot of Conservative MPs on 18 October 2005, Cameron came second, with 56 votes, slightly more than expected; David Davis had fewer than predicted at 62 votes; Liam Fox came third with 42 votes; and Kenneth Clarke was eliminated with 38 votes. In the second ballot on 20 October 2005, Cameron came first with 90 votes; David Davis was second, with 57; and Liam Fox was eliminated with 51 votes. All 198 Conservative MPs voted in both ballots.

The next stage of the election process, between Davis and Cameron, was a vote open to the entire party membership. Cameron was elected with more than twice as many votes as Davis and more than half of all ballots issued; Cameron won 134,446 votes on a 78% turnout, to Davis's 64,398. Although Davis had initially been the favourite, it was widely acknowledged that his candidacy was marred by a disappointing conference speech. Cameron's election as the Leader of the Conservative Party and Leader of the Opposition was announced on 6 December 2005. As is customary for an Opposition leader not already a member, upon election Cameron became a member of the Privy Council, being formally approved to join on 14 December 2005, and sworn of the council on 8 March 2006.

Reaction to Cameron as Leader

Cameron's relative youth and inexperience before becoming leader invited satirical comparison with Tony Blair. Private Eye soon published a picture of both leaders on its front cover, with the caption "World's first face transplant a success". On the left, the New Statesman unfavourably likened his "new style of politics" to Tony Blair's early leadership years. Cameron was accused of paying excessive attention to appearance: ITV News broadcast footage from the 2006 Conservative Party Conference in Bournemouth showing him wearing four different sets of clothes within a few hours. In his column for The Guardian, comedy writer and broadcaster Charlie Brooker described the Conservative leader as "a hollow Easter egg with no bag of sweets inside" in April 2007.

On the right of the party, Norman Tebbit, the former Conservative chairman, likened Cameron to Pol Pot, "intent on purging even the memory of Thatcherism before building a New Modern Compassionate Green Globally Aware Party". Quentin Davies MP, who defected from the Conservatives to Labour on 26 June 2007, branded him "superficial, unreliable and [with] an apparent lack of any clear convictions" and stated that David Cameron had turned the Conservative Party's mission into a "PR agenda". Traditionalist conservative columnist and author Peter Hitchens wrote, "Mr Cameron has abandoned the last significant difference between his party and the established left", by embracing social liberalism. The Daily Telegraph correspondent and blogger Gerald Warner was particularly scathing about Cameron's leadership, saying that it alienated traditionalist conservative elements from the Conservative Party.

Before he became Conservative leader, Cameron was reportedly known to friends and family as "Dave", though his preference is "David" in public.  Labour used the slogan Dave the Chameleon in their 2006 local elections party broadcast to portray Cameron as an ever-changing populist, which was criticised as negative campaigning by the Conservative press including The Daily Telegraph, though Cameron asserted the broadcast had become his daughter's "favourite video".

Allegations of recreational drug use
During the leadership election, allegations were made that Cameron had used cannabis and cocaine recreationally before becoming an MP. Pressed on this point during the BBC television programme Question Time, Cameron expressed the view that everybody was allowed to "err and stray" in their past. During his 2005 Conservative leadership campaign he addressed the question of drug consumption by remarking that "I did lots of things before I came into politics which I shouldn't have done. We all did."

Shadow Cabinet appointments
 

His Shadow Cabinet appointments included MPs associated with the various wings of the party. Former leader William Hague was appointed to the Foreign Affairs brief, while both George Osborne and David Davis were retained, as Shadow Chancellor of the Exchequer and Shadow Home Secretary respectively. Hague, assisted by Davis, stood in for Cameron during his paternity leave in February 2006. In June 2008, Davis announced his intention to resign as an MP, and was immediately replaced as Shadow Home Secretary by Dominic Grieve; Davis' surprise move was seen as a challenge to the changes introduced under Cameron's leadership.

A reshuffle of the Shadow Cabinet was undertaken in January 2009. The chief change was the appointment of former Chancellor of the Exchequer Kenneth Clarke as Shadow Business, Enterprise and Regulatory Reform Secretary, David Cameron stating that "With Ken Clarke's arrival, we now have the best economic team." The reshuffle also saw eight other changes made.

European Conservatives and Reformists
During his successful 2005 campaign to be elected Leader of the Conservative Party, Cameron pledged that the Conservative Party's Members of the European Parliament would leave the European People's Party group, which had a "federalist" approach to the European Union. Once elected Cameron began discussions with right-wing and Eurosceptic parties in other European countries, mainly in eastern Europe, and in July 2006 he concluded an agreement to form the Movement for European Reform with the Czech Civic Democratic Party, leading to the formation of a new European Parliament group, the European Conservatives and Reformists, in 2009 after the European Parliament elections.
Cameron attended a gathering at Warsaw's Palladium cinema celebrating the foundation of the alliance.

In forming the caucus, which had 54 MEPs drawn from eight of the 27 EU member states, Cameron reportedly broke with two decades of Conservative co-operation with the centre-right Christian Democrats, the European People's Party (EPP), on the grounds that they are dominated by European federalists and supporters of the Lisbon treaty. EPP leader Wilfried Martens, former prime minister of Belgium, has stated "Cameron's campaign has been to take his party back to the centre in every policy area with one major exception: Europe. ... I can't understand his tactics. Merkel and Sarkozy will never accept his Euroscepticism."

Shortlists for Parliamentary candidates
Similarly, Cameron's initial "A-List" of prospective parliamentary candidates was attacked by members of his party, and the policy was discontinued in favour of sex-balanced final shortlists. Before being discontinued, the policy had been criticised by senior Conservative MP and former Prisons Spokeswoman Ann Widdecombe as an "insult to women", and she had accused Cameron of "storing up huge problems for the future."

South Africa
In April 2009, The Independent reported that in 1989, while Nelson Mandela remained imprisoned under the apartheid regime, David Cameron had accepted a trip to South Africa paid for by an anti-sanctions lobby firm. A spokesperson for Cameron responded by saying that the Conservative Party was at that time opposed to sanctions against South Africa and that his trip was a fact-finding mission. However, the newspaper reported that Cameron's then superior at Conservative Research Department called the trip "jolly", saying that "it was all terribly relaxed, just a little treat, a perk of the job. The Botha regime was attempting to make itself look less horrible, but I don't regard it as having been of the faintest political consequence." Cameron distanced himself from his party's history of opposing sanctions against the regime. He was criticised by Labour MP Peter Hain, himself an anti-apartheid campaigner.

Raising teaching standards
At the launch of the Conservative Party's education manifesto in January 2010, Cameron declared an admiration for the "brazenly elite" approach to education of countries such as Singapore and South Korea and expressed a desire to "elevate the status of teaching in our country". He suggested the adoption of more stringent criteria for entry to teaching and offered repayment of the loans of maths and science graduates obtaining first or 2.1 degrees from "good" universities.

Wes Streeting, then president of the National Union of Students, said "The message that the Conservatives are sending to the majority of students is that if you didn't go to a university attended by members of the Shadow Cabinet, they don't believe you're worth as much."

Expenses
During the MPs expenses scandal in 2009, Cameron said he would lead Conservatives in repaying "excessive" expenses and threatened to expel MPs that refused after the expense claims of several members of his shadow cabinet had been questioned:We have to acknowledge just how bad this is, the public are really angry and we have to start by saying, "Look, this system that we have, that we used, that we operated, that we took part in—it was wrong and we are sorry about that".

One day later, The Daily Telegraph published figures showing over five years he had claimed £82,450 on his second home allowance. Cameron repaid £680 claimed for repairs to his constituency home. Although he was not accused of breaking any rules, Cameron was placed on the defensive over mortgage interest expense claims covering his constituency home, after a report in The Mail on Sunday suggested he could have reduced the mortgage interest bill by putting an additional £75,000 of his own money towards purchasing the home in Witney instead of paying off an earlier mortgage on his London home. Cameron said that doing things differently would not have saved the taxpayer any money, as he was paying more on mortgage interest than he was able to reclaim as expenses anyway He also spoke out in favour of laws giving voters the power to "recall" or "sack" MPs accused of wrongdoing. In April 2014, he was criticised for his handling of the expenses row surrounding Culture Secretary Maria Miller, when he rejected calls from fellow Conservative MPs to sack her from the front bench.

2010 general election

The Conservatives had last won a general election in 1992. The 2010 general election resulted in the Conservatives, led by Cameron, winning the largest number of seats (306). This was, however, 20 seats short of an overall majority and resulted in the nation's first hung parliament since February 1974.

2010 government formation

Talks between Cameron and Liberal Democrat leader Nick Clegg led to an agreed Conservative/Liberal Democrat coalition. Cameron in late 2009 had urged the Liberal Democrats to join the Conservatives in a new "national movement" saying there was "barely a cigarette paper" between them on a large number of issues. The invitation was rejected at the time by the Liberal Democrat leader, Nick Clegg, who said that the Conservatives were totally different from his party and that the Lib Dems were the true "progressives" in UK politics.

Prime minister (2010–2016)

On 11 May 2010, following the resignation of Gordon Brown as prime minister and on his recommendation, Queen Elizabeth II invited Cameron to form a new administration. At age 43, Cameron became the youngest prime minister since Lord Liverpool in 1812, beating the record previously set by Tony Blair in May 1997. In his first address outside 10 Downing Street, he announced his intention to form a coalition government, the first since the Second World War, with the Liberal Democrats.

Cameron outlined how he intended to "put aside party differences and work hard for the common good and for the national interest." As one of his first moves Cameron appointed Nick Clegg, the leader of the Liberal Democrats, as deputy prime minister on 11 May 2010. Between them, the Conservatives and Liberal Democrats controlled 363 seats in the House of Commons, with a majority of 76 seats.

In June 2010 Cameron described the economic situation as he came to power as "even worse than we thought" and warned of "difficult decisions" to be made over spending cuts. By the beginning of 2015 he was able to claim that his government's austerity programme had succeeded in halving the budget deficit, although as a percentage of GDP rather than in cash terms.

In December 2010, Cameron attended a meeting with FIFA vice-president Chung Mong-joon in which a vote-trading deal for the right to host the 2018 World Cup in England was discussed.

Cameron agreed to holding the 2014 Scottish independence referendum and eliminated the "devomax" option from the ballot for a straight out yes or no vote. His support for the successful Better Together campaign extended to making a successful request to the Queen to intervene. He had also backed a successful campaign to retain the status quo in a referendum on changing the voting system held at the request of his coalition partners. The 2016 referendum on the UK's membership of the European Union meant that his tenure as British prime minister saw an unprecedented three referendums on the UK's constitutional future.

He supported the introduction of gay marriage despite more of his own Conservative MPs voting against the move than for it, meaning the support of Lib Dem MPs in government and Labour MPs in opposition was required to allow it to pass.

Earlier in his term he had managed to secure a huge majority for UK participation in UN-backed military action in Libya, but Cameron became the first prime minister since 1782 to lose a foreign policy vote in the House of Commons over proposed military action against Bashar al-Assad's regime in Syria. Subsequently, Barack Obama asked congressional approval, which was not ultimately granted.

Economy

In response to the Great Recession, Cameron undertook the austerity programme. This was a deficit reduction programme consisting of sustained reductions in public spending, intended to reduce the government budget deficit and the welfare state in the United Kingdom. The National Health Service and education have been "ringfenced" and protected from direct spending cuts. Together with Chancellor George Osborne, Cameron aimed to eliminate the structural deficit (i.e. deficit on current spending as opposed to investment) and to have government debt falling as a percentage of GDP. By 2015, the deficit as a percentage of GDP had been reduced to half what it was in 2010, and the sale of government assets (mostly the shares of banks nationalised in the 2000s) had resulted in government debt as a proportion of GDP falling.

Immigration
Cameron said immigration from outside the EU should be subject to annual limits. He said in July 2013 that "in the last decade we have had an immigration policy that's completely lax. The pressure it puts on our public services and communities is too great." In 2015, The Independent reported, "The Conservatives have failed spectacularly to deliver their pledge to reduce net migration to less than 100,000 a year. The Office for National Statistics (ONS) announced a net flow of 298,000 migrants to the UK in the 12 months to September 2014—up from 210,000 in the previous year."

Defence and foreign affairs

Defence cuts

In 2014, Cameron dismissed warnings that his cuts to the UK defence budget had left it less than a "first class-player in terms of defence" and no longer a "full partner" to the United States.

In the July 2015 budget Chancellor George Osborne announced that the UK defence spending would meet the NATO target of 2% of GDP.

NATO military intervention in Libya

Cameron condemned the violence used against anti-Gaddafi protesters at the beginning of the Libyan Civil War After weeks of lobbying by the UK and its allies, on 17 March 2011 the United Nations Security Council approved a no-fly zone to prevent government forces loyal to Muammar Gaddafi from carrying out air attacks on anti-Gaddafi rebels. Two days later the UK and the United States fired more than 110 Tomahawk missiles at targets in Libya.

Cameron said he was "proud" of the role United Kingdom played in the overthrow of Gaddafi's government. Cameron also stated that UK had played a "very important role", adding that "a lot of people said that Tripoli was completely different to Benghazi and that the two don't get on—they were wrong. ... People who said 'this is all going to be an enormous swamp of Islamists and extremists'—they were wrong".

In 2015 through 2016 the Foreign Affairs Select Committee conducted an extensive and highly critical inquiry into the British involvement in the civil war. It concluded that the early threat to civilians had been overstated and that the significant Islamist element in the rebel forces had not been recognised, due to an intelligence failure. By mid-2011 the initial limited intervention to protect Libyan civilians had become a policy of regime change. However that new policy did not include proper support and for a new government, leading to a political and economic collapse in Libya and the growth of ISIL in North Africa. It concluded that Cameron was ultimately responsible for this British policy failure.

US President Barack Obama also acknowledged there had been issues with following up the conflict planning, commenting in an interview with The Atlantic magazine that Cameron had allowed himself to be "distracted by a range of other things".

Falklands

In 2013, in response to Argentina's calls for negotiations over the Falkland Islands' sovereignty, a referendum was called asking Falkland Islanders whether they supported the continuation of their status as an Overseas Territory of the United Kingdom.  With a turnout of 91.94%, an overwhelming 99.8% voted to remain a British territory with only three votes against.

In light of this, Cameron said: "We believe in the Falkland islanders' right to self-determination. They had a referendum. They couldn't have been more clear about wanting to remain with our country and we should protect and defend them".

Saudi Arabia
Cameron supported Britain's close relationship with Saudi Arabia. In January 2015, Cameron travelled to the Saudi capital Riyadh to pay his respects following the death of the nation's King Abdullah.

According to WikiLeaks, Cameron initiated a secret deal with Saudi Arabia ensuring both countries were elected onto the U.N. Human Rights Council. In 2015, Cameron's government announced "firm political support" for the Saudi Arabian-led intervention in Yemen against the Shi'a Houthis, re-supplying the Saudi military with weapons and providing them with training.

Sri Lanka
Cameron reiterated calls for an independent investigation into the alleged war crimes during the final stages of the Sri Lankan Civil War. "There needs to be proper inquiries into what happened at the end of the war, there needs to be proper human rights, democracy for the Tamil minority in that country" Cameron stated. He stated that, if this investigation was not completed by March 2014, he would press for an independent international inquiry. This followed a visit to Jaffna, a war-ravaged town in the northern part of Sri Lanka; Cameron was the first foreign leader to visit Jaffna since the island once colonised by Britain became independent in 1948. Cameron was mobbed by demonstrators, mostly women, seeking his assistance in tracing missing relatives.

Turkey
In a speech in Ankara in July 2010, Cameron stated unequivocally his support for Turkey's accession to the EU, citing economic, security and political considerations, and claimed that those who opposed Turkish membership were driven by "protectionism, narrow nationalism or prejudice". In that speech, he was also critical of Israeli action during the Gaza flotilla raid and its Gaza policy, and repeated his opinion that Israel had turned Gaza into a "prison camp", having previously referred to Gaza as "a giant open prison". These views were met with mixed reactions. The Cameron government declined to formally recognise the Ottoman Empire's massacres of Armenians as a "genocide".

During the EU referendum campaign, Cameron stated that Turkey was unlikely to be ready to join the EU 'until the year 3000' at its current rate of progress.

Israel
At the end of May 2011, Cameron stepped down as patron of the Jewish National Fund, becoming the first British prime minister not to be patron of the charity in the 110 years of its existence.

In a speech in 2011 Cameron said: "You have a prime minister whose commitment and determination to work for peace in Israel is deep and strong. Britain will continue to push for peace, but will always stand up for Israel against those who wish her harm". He said he wanted to reaffirm his "unshakable" belief in Israel within the same message. He also voiced his opposition to the Goldstone Report, claiming it had been biased against Israel and not enough blame had been placed on Hamas.

In March 2014, during his first visit to Israel as prime minister, Cameron addressed Israel's Knesset in Jerusalem, where he offered his full support for peace efforts between Israelis and Palestinians, hoping a two-state solution might be achieved. He also made clear his rejection of trade or academic boycotts against Israel, acknowledged Israel's right to defend its citizens as "a right enshrined in international law," and made note of the Balfour Declaration of 1917, as "the moment when the State of Israel went from a dream to a plan, Britain has played a proud and vital role in helping to secure Israel as a homeland for the Jewish people." During his two-day visit, he met with Israeli Prime Minister Benjamin Netanyahu and with Palestinian Authority President Mahmoud Abbas. Senior Foreign Office minister Baroness Warsi resigned over the Cameron government's decision not to condemn Israel for the 2014 Israel–Gaza conflict, saying that the government's "approach and language during the current crisis in Gaza is morally indefensible."

Military intervention in Iraq and Syria

In August 2013, Cameron lost a motion in favour of bombing Syrian armed forces in response to the Ghouta chemical attack, becoming the first prime minister to suffer such a foreign-policy defeat since 1782. In September 2014, MPs passed a motion in favour of British planes joining, at the request of the Iraqi government, a bombing campaign against Islamic State (IS) targets in Iraq; the motion explicitly expressed parliament's disapproval of UK military action in Syria. Cameron promised that, before expanding UK air strikes and ground support to include IS units in Syria, he would seek parliamentary approval.

In July 2015, a Freedom of Information (FOI) request by Reprieve revealed that, without the knowledge of UK parliamentarians, RAF pilots had, in fact, been bombing targets in Syria, and that Cameron knew of this. The prime minister, along with Defence Secretary Michael Fallon, faced strong criticism, including from Conservative MPs, for not informing the Commons about this deployment; the Ministry of Defence said that the pilots concerned were "embedded" with foreign military forces, and so were "effectively" operating as such, while Fallon denied that MPs had been, as he put it, "kept in the dark". The Reprieve FoI request also revealed that British drone pilots had been embedded, almost continuously, with American forces at Creech Air Force Base since 2008. These drone operators, who were "a gift of services", meaning the UK still paid their salaries and covered their expenses, had been carrying out operations that included reconnaissance in Syria to assist American strikes against IS.

Fallon said that it was "illogical" for the UK not to bomb ISIL in Syria, for the organisation does not "differentiate between Syria and Iraq" and is "organised and directed and administered from Syria". Following the terrorist attacks on Paris in November 2015, for which Islamic State claimed responsibility, Cameron began pushing for a strategy for the Royal Air Force to bomb Syria in retaliation. Cameron set out his case for military intervention to Parliament on 26 November, telling MPs that it was the only way to guarantee Britain's safety and would be part of a "comprehensive" strategy to defeat IS. On 3 December 2015 MPs voted 397–223 in favour of launching air strikes against ISIL targets in Syria. The vote for military action was supported by all but seven members of the Parliamentary Conservative Party, as well as 66 Labour MPs who backed the government in defiance of their leader, Jeremy Corbyn, who had expressed his opposition to air strikes.

2015 general election

On 7 May 2015, Cameron was re-elected UK prime minister with a majority in the Commons. The Conservative Party's decisive victory in the general election was a surprise, as most polls and commentators had suggested the outcome was too close to call and that the result would be a second hung parliament. Cameron said of his first term when returned as prime minister for a second term that he was "proud to lead the first coalition government in 70 years" and offered particular thanks to Clegg for his role in it. Forming the first Conservative majority government since 1992, David Cameron became the first prime minister to be re-elected immediately after a full term with a larger popular vote share since Lord Salisbury at the 1900 general election.

In response to the November 2015 Paris attacks, Cameron secured the support of the House of Commons to extend air strikes against ISIS into Syria. Earlier that year, Cameron had outlined a five-year strategy to counter Islamist extremism and subversive teachings.

2016 referendum and resignation

As promised in the election manifesto, Cameron set a date for a referendum on whether the UK should remain a member of the European Union, and announced that he would be campaigning for Britain to remain within a "reformed EU". The terms of the UK's membership of the EU were re-negotiated, with agreement reached in February 2016. The option to leave came to be known as Brexit (a portmanteau of "British" and "exit").

The referendum was held on 23 June 2016. The result was approximately 52% in favour of leaving the European Union and 48% against, with a turnout of 72%. On 24 June, a few hours after the results became known, Cameron announced that he would resign the office of prime minister by the start of the Conservative Party Conference in October 2016. In a speech the next day outside 10 Downing Street, he stated that, on account of his own advocacy on behalf of remaining in the EU, "I do not think it would be right for me to try to be the captain that steers our country to its next destination."

There was some strong criticism made of Cameron and his government following the referendum. Matthew Norman, in an opinion piece in The Independent, called the referendum an act of "indescribably selfish recklessness." In late July, Parliament's Foreign Affairs Select Committee was told that Cameron had refused to allow the Civil Service to make plans for Brexit, a decision the committee described as "an act of gross negligence." His farewell speech as he left No 10 accompanied by his family stressed the value of selfless public service.

The Conservative Party leadership election was scheduled for 9 September and the new leader was expected to be in place by the autumn conference, set to begin on 2 October. On 11 July, following the withdrawal of Andrea Leadsom from the Conservative Party leadership election and the confirmation of Theresa May as the new leader of the Conservative Party, Cameron announced he would hold a final cabinet meeting on 12 July and then following a final Prime Minister's Questions submit his resignation to the Queen on the afternoon of 13 July. After his final Prime Minister's Questions, Cameron received a standing ovation from MPs; his final comment was, "I was the future once" – a reference to his 2005 quip to Tony Blair, "he was the future once". Cameron then submitted his resignation to the Queen later that day.

Although no longer serving as prime minister, Cameron originally stated that he would continue inside Parliament, on the Conservative backbenches. On 12 September, however, he announced that he was resigning his seat with immediate effect, and was appointed to the Manor of Northstead. He was succeeded as MP for Witney by fellow Conservative Robert Courts. The Washington Post described him as having "sped away without glancing back" once Theresa May had "vaulted herself out of the hurricane-strength political wreckage of Britain's vote to leave the European Union."

Political views and image

Self-description of views
Cameron described himself in December 2005 as a "modern compassionate conservative" and spoke of a need for a new style of politics, saying that he was "fed up with the Punch and Judy politics of Westminster". He was "certainly a big Thatcher fan, but I don't know whether that makes me a Thatcherite", saying he was a "liberal Conservative", though "not a deeply ideological person."  As Leader of the Opposition, Cameron asserted that he did not intend to oppose the government as a matter of course, and would offer his support in areas of agreement. He has urged politicians to concentrate more on improving people's happiness and "general well-being", instead of focusing solely on "financial wealth". There were claims that he described himself to journalists at a dinner during the leadership contest as the "heir to Blair".

In his first Conservative conference speech as party leader in Bournemouth in 2006, he described the National Health Service as "one of the 20th Century's greatest achievements". He went on to say, "Tony Blair explained his priorities in three words: education, education, education. I can do it in three letters: N.H.S." He also talked about his severely disabled son, Ivan, concluding "So, for me, it is not just a question of saying the NHS is safe in my hands—of course it will be. My family is so often in the hands of the NHS, so I want them to be safe there."

Cameron said that he believed in "spreading freedom and democracy, and supporting humanitarian intervention" in cases such as the genocide in Darfur, Sudan. However, he rejected neoconservatism because, as a conservative, he recognises "the complexities of human nature, and will always be sceptical of grand schemes to remake the world." A supporter of multilateralism as "a country may act alone—but it cannot always succeed alone", he believes multilateralism can take the form of acting through "NATO, the UN, the G8, the EU and other institutions", or through international alliances. Cameron said that "If the West is to help other countries, we must do so from a position of genuine moral authority" and "we must strive above all for legitimacy in what we do."

He believes that British Muslims have a duty to integrate into British culture, but noted in an article published in 2007 that the Muslim community finds aspects such as high divorce rates and drug use uninspiring, and that "Not for the first time, I found myself thinking that it is mainstream Britain which needs to integrate more with the British Asian way of life, not the other way around." In his first speech as PM on radicalisation and the causes of terrorism in February 2011, Cameron said that 'state multiculturalism' had failed. In 2010, he appointed the first Muslim member of the British cabinet, Baroness Warsi, as a minister without portfolio, and in 2012 made her a special minister of state in foreign affairs. She resigned, however, in August 2014 over the government's handling of the 2014 Israel–Gaza conflict.

Whilst urging members of his party to support the coalition's proposals for same-sex marriage, Cameron said that he backed gay marriage not in spite of his conservatism but because he is a conservative, and claimed it was about equality. In 2012, Cameron publicly apologised for Thatcher-era policies on homosexuality, specifically the introduction of the controversial Section 28 of the Local Government Act 1988, which he described as "a mistake".

Home affairs

Poverty

In 2006 Cameron described poverty as a "moral disgrace" and promised to tackle relative poverty. In 2007 Cameron promised, "We can make British poverty history, and we will make British poverty history". Also in 2007 he stated "Ending child poverty is central to improving child well-being". In 2015, Polly Toynbee questioned Cameron's commitment to tackling poverty, contrasting his earlier statements agreeing that "poverty is relative" with proposals to change the government's poverty measure, and saying that cuts in child tax credits would increase child poverty among low-paid working families. Cameron denied that austerity had contributed to the 2011 England riots, instead blaming street gangs and opportunistic looters.

LGBT rights
In 2010 Cameron was given a score of 36% in favour of lesbian, gay and bisexual equality by Stonewall. Prior to 2005,  Cameron was opposed to gay rights, calling it a "fringe agenda" and attacking Prime Minister Tony Blair for "moving heaven and earth to allow the promotion of homosexuality in our schools" by repealing the anti-gay Section 28 of the Local Government Act 1988. Cameron is recorded by Hansard as having voted against same-sex adoption rights in 2002, but he denies this, claiming he abstained from the three-line whip imposed on him by his party. In 2008, he wanted lesbians who receive IVF treatment to be required to name a father figure, which received condemnation from LGBT equality groups. However, Cameron supported commitment for gay couples in a 2005 speech, and in October 2011 urged Conservative MPs to support gay marriage.

In November 2012, Cameron and Nick Clegg agreed to fast-track legislation for introducing same-sex marriage. Cameron stated that he wanted to give religious groups the ability to host gay marriage ceremonies, and that he did not want to exclude gay people from a "great institution". In 2013, the Marriage (Same Sex Couples) Act 2013 became law despite opposition from more than half of his fellow Conservative MPs, including Cabinet ministers Owen Paterson and David Jones. He also subsequently appointed two women who had voted against same-sex marriage as ministers in the Government Equalities Office, Nicky Morgan and Caroline Dinenage following the 2015 general election.

In August 2013, he rejected calls by Stephen Fry and others to strip Russia from hosting the 2014 Winter Olympics due to its anti-gay laws. Cameron did not attend the games but denied it was a boycott in protest at Russia's laws, having previously raised the issue of gay rights in the country with Vladimir Putin.

Marriage and family values
In 2009 Cameron said "the restoration of family values and a new commitment to economic and social responsibility" were "key to repairing 'broken Britain'". In 2013 Cameron described himself as "a marriage man, I am a great supporter of marriage. I want to promote marriage, defend marriage, encourage marriage." As such he rejected calls from Conservative MP Christopher Chope to extend civil partnership rights to heterosexual couples, saying "I think we should be promoting marriage rather than looking at any other way of weakening it." In 2018 the Supreme Court ruled unanimously that this position was discriminatory.

Comments on other parties and politicians
Cameron criticised Gordon Brown (when Brown was Chancellor of the Exchequer) for being "an analogue politician in a digital age" and referred to him as "the roadblock to reform". As prime minister, he reacted to press reports that Brown could be the next head of the International Monetary Fund by hinting that he may block the appointment, citing the huge national debt that Brown left the country with as a reason for Brown not being suitable for the role.

He said that John Prescott "clearly looks a fool" after Prescott's personal indiscretions were revealed in spring 2006, and wondered if the Deputy Prime Minister had broken the ministerial code. During a speech to the Ethnic Media Conference in November 2006, Cameron also described Ken Livingstone, the Mayor of London, as an "ageing far left politician" following Livingstone's criticism of Trevor Phillips, head of the Commission for Racial Equality.

In January 2007, Cameron made a speech in which he described extremist Islamic organisations and the British National Party as "mirror images" to each other, both preaching "creeds of pure hatred". Cameron is listed as being a supporter of Unite Against Fascism.

In April 2006, Cameron accused the UK Independence Party of being "fruitcakes, loonies and closet racists, mostly", leading UKIP MEP Nigel Farage (who became leader in September of that year) to demand an apology for the remarks. Right-wing Conservative MP Bob Spink, who later defected to UKIP, also criticised the remarks, as did The Daily Telegraph. Cameron was seen encouraging Conservative MPs to join the standing ovation given to Tony Blair at the end of his last Prime Minister's Question Time; he had paid tribute to the "huge efforts" Blair had made and said Blair had "considerable achievements to his credit, whether it is peace in Northern Ireland or his work in the developing world, which will endure".

In September 2015, after the election of Jeremy Corbyn as Labour leader, Cameron called the party a "threat" to British national and economic security, on the basis of Corbyn's defence and fiscal policies.

Foreign affairs

Iraq War
In an interview on Friday Night with Jonathan Ross in 2006, Cameron said that he supported the decision of the then Labour Government to go to war in Iraq, and said that he thought supporters should "see it through". He also supported a motion brought by the SNP and Plaid Cymru in 2006 calling for an inquiry into the government's conduct of the Iraq war. In 2011, he oversaw the withdrawal of British soldiers from Iraq. He repeatedly called for the Chilcot Inquiry into the Iraq war to conclude and publish its findings, saying "People want to know the truth".

India
Cameron was a strong advocate of increased ties between India and the United Kingdom, describing Indian–British relations as the "New Special Relationship" in 2010.

In October 2012, as Narendra Modi rose to prominence in India, the UK rescinded its boycott of the then-Gujarat state Chief Minister over religious riots in Gujarat in 2002 that left more than 2,000 dead, and in November 2013, Cameron commented that he was "open" to meeting Modi. Modi was later elected as prime minister in a landslide majority, leading to Cameron calling Modi and congratulating him on the "election success", one of the first Western leaders to do so.

Political image

Allegations of social elitism

While Leader of the Conservative Party, Cameron was accused of reliance on "old-boy networks", and conversely attacked by his party for the imposition of selective shortlists of women and ethnic minority prospective parliamentary candidates.

Some of Cameron's senior appointments, such as George Osborne as Chancellor of the Exchequer, are former members of the Bullingdon Club. Michael Gove conceded it was "ridiculous" how many fellow Cabinet ministers were old Etonians, though he placed the blame on the failings of the state education system rather than Cameron. However, Michael Mosbacher, co-founder of Standpoint magazine, wrote that Cameron's Cabinet has the lowest number of Etonians of any past Conservative government: "David Cameron's government is the least patrician, least wealthy and least public-school-educated—indeed the least Etonian Conservative-led government this country has ever seen".

Plots against leadership
Following poor results in the May 2012 local elections after a difficult few months for the government, with Labour increasing its lead in the polls, there were concerns from Conservative MPs about Cameron's leadership and his electability. David Davies, the chairman of the Welsh Affairs Select Committee, accused the Conservative leadership of "incompetence" and hinted that it could risk Cameron's leadership. Nadine Dorries warned the Prime Minister that a leadership challenge could happen.

Later that year, Conservative MP Brian Binley openly said that Cameron's leadership was like being a "maid" to the Liberal Democrats, and accused him of leading the party to defeat. In January 2013 it was revealed that Adam Afriyie was planning his own bid for the Conservative leadership with the support of fellow MPs Mark Field, Bill Wiggin, Chris Heaton-Harris, Patrick Mercer, Jonathan Djanogly and Dan Byles. The Times and ConservativeHome revealed that a 'rebel reserve' of 55 Conservative MPs gave firm pledges to a co-ordinating MP to support a motion of 'no confidence' and write to Brady simultaneously, more than the 46 MPs needed to trigger a vote of no confidence. Andrew Bridgen openly called for a vote of confidence in Cameron's leadership and claimed that the Prime Minister had a "credibility problem" but he dropped his bid for a contest a year later.

Cameron and Andy Coulson
In 2007 Cameron appointed Andy Coulson, former editor of the News of the World, as his director of communications. Coulson had resigned as the paper's editor following the conviction of a reporter in relation to illegal phone hacking, although stating that he knew nothing about it. In June 2010 Downing Street confirmed Coulson's annual salary as £140,000, the highest pay of any special adviser to UK Government.

In January 2011 Coulson left his post, saying coverage of the phone-hacking scandal was making it difficult to give his best to the job. In July 2011 he was arrested and questioned by police in connection with further allegations of illegal activities at the News of the World, and released on bail. Despite a call to apologise for hiring Coulson by the leader of the opposition, Cameron defended the appointment, saying that he had taken a conscious choice to give someone who had screwed up a second chance. The same month, in a special parliamentary session at the House of Commons, arranged to discuss the News International phone hacking scandal, Cameron said that he "regretted the furore" that had resulted from his appointment of Coulson, and that "with hindsight" he would not have hired him. Coulson was detained and charged with perjury by Strathclyde Police in May 2012. Coulson was convicted of conspiracy to hack phones in June 2014. Prior to the jury handing down their verdict, Cameron issued a "full and frank" apology for hiring him, saying "I am extremely sorry that I employed him. It was the wrong decision and I am very clear about that." The judge hearing Coulson's trial was critical of the prime minister, pondering whether the intervention was out of ignorance or deliberate, and demanded an explanation.

Cameron and Lord Ashcroft
Although Lord Ashcroft played a significant role in the 2010 election, he was not offered a ministerial post. In June 2012, shortly before a major Conservative rebellion on House of Lords reform, journalist Peter Oborne credited Ashcroft with "stopping the Coalition working" by moving policy on Europe, welfare, education, taxation to the right. According to Oborne, Ashcroft, owner of both the ConservativeHome and PoliticsHome websites and a "brutal critic of the Coalition from the start", had established "megaphone presence" in the on-line media. He believes Cameron's philosophy of liberal conservatism has been destroyed by "coordinated attacks on the Coalition" and "the two parties are no longer trying to pretend that they are governing together."

In The Observer, Andrew Rawnsley commented that he believes that Ashcroft uses carefully timed opinion polls to "generate publicity", "stir trouble for the prime minister" and influence the direction of the party. In 2015 Ashcroft released Call Me Dave, an unauthorised biography of Cameron written with journalist Isabel Oakeshott, which attracted significant media attention for various lurid allegations about Cameron's time at university. The book includes an anonymous anecdote about Cameron, now referred to as Piggate, in which he allegedly inserted his penis into a dead pig's head.  No evidence for the anecdote has been produced. Many commentators have described the accusations as a "revenge job" by Ashcroft, who was not offered a senior role in government when Cameron came to power in 2010. Ashcroft initially claimed the book was "not about settling scores", while Oakeshott said that they had held back publication until after the 2015 general election to avoid damaging Cameron and the Conservatives' electoral chances. Ashcroft subsequently admitted that the initiation allegations "may have been case of mistaken identity" and has stated that he has a personal "beef" with Cameron. Cameron later went on to deny these allegations and stated that Ashcroft's reasons for writing the book were clear and the public could see clearly through it.

Standing in opinion polls

An ICM poll in September 2007 saw Cameron rated the least popular of the three main party leaders. A YouGov poll on party leaders conducted on 9–10 June 2011 found 44% of the electorate thought he was doing well and 50% thought he was doing badly, whilst 38% thought he would be the best PM and 35% did not know. In the run up to the 2015 election, Cameron achieved his first net positive approval rating in four years, with a YouGov poll finding 47% of voters thought he was doing well as prime minister compared with 46% who thought he was doing badly.

In September 2015, an Opinium poll had similar results to the one shortly before the election, with voters split with 42% who approved of him and 41% who did not. Cameron had significantly better net approval ratings in polls conducting in December and January (getting −6 in both) than Labour leader Jeremy Corbyn (who got −38 and −39). However, following the Panama Papers leak in April 2016, his personal approval ratings fell below Corbyn's.

Evaluations of premiership
In the months immediately following his resignation from the post of prime minister, a number of commentators gave negative evaluations of Cameron's premiership. The University of Leeds' 2016 survey of post-War prime ministers, which collected the views of 82 academics specialising in the history and politics of post-war Britain, ranked Cameron as the third-worst prime minister since 1945, ranking above only Alec Douglas-Home and Anthony Eden. 90% of respondents cited his calling and losing of the Brexit referendum as his greatest failure.

Post-premiership

Positions 
In October 2016, Cameron became chairman of the National Citizen Service Patrons. In January 2017, he was appointed president of Alzheimer's Research UK to address misconceptions surrounding dementia and campaign for medical research funding to tackle the condition.

All appointments post-premiership have to be approved by the UK government's Advisory Committee on Business Appointments. In addition to the two posts above they also approved the following positions:
 Consultant for Illumina Inc.
 Vice-chair, UK China Fund
 Director, ONE
 Consultant for First Data Corp.
 Member of Council on Foreign Relations
 Chairman, LSE-Oxford Commission on Growth in Fragile States
 Registered member of Washington Speakers Bureau
 Chairman of advisory board, Afiniti

Brexit 
Cameron maintained a low profile following his resignation as prime minister and the subsequent Brexit negotiations. In January 2019, following Theresa May's defeat in the House of Commons over her draft withdrawal agreement, Cameron gave a rare interview to reporters outside his house in Notting Hill, saying he backed May's Brexit deal with the EU and did not regret calling the 2016 referendum. However, he later said that the outcome of the referendum had left him "hugely depressed" and told The Times he knew "some people will never forgive me". He confessed "Every single day I think about it, and the fact that we lost, and the consequences, and the things that could have been done differently, and I worry desperately".

Months following Boris Johnson's election as prime minister, Cameron began criticising Johnson's Brexit strategy, including his decision to prorogue parliament ahead of the Brexit deadline of 31 October and the removal of the whip from Conservative MPs who voted to block a no-deal Brexit. Additionally, he accused Johnson, as well as Michael Gove, of behaving "appallingly" during the referendum campaign of 2016.

In September 2020, Cameron became the fifth former prime minister to criticise the UK Internal Market Bill, over which he said he had "misgivings".

Memoir 
On 19 September 2019, Cameron published a memoir,  For the Record, through HarperCollins. He was reported to have signed an £800,000 contract for the book. According to the Guardian, the book was initially scheduled for 2018, but was delayed so Cameron would not be perceived as a "backstreet driver" in the ongoing Brexit negotiations.

Greensill scandal 

During Cameron's premiership, the financier Lex Greensill, was an unpaid advisor who had access to eleven government departments. In 2018, Cameron became an advisor to Greensill Capital and held share options in the company reportedly worth as much as $60 million as well as being paid over $1 million each year for 25 days work per year. A Panorama investigation concluded that overall, through a combination of his salary and share sales, Cameron earned around $10 million before tax for 30 months part-time work.

In 2019, Cameron arranged for a private meeting with Lex Greensill and Secretary of State for Health and Social Care Matt Hancock; under Hancock, several NHS trusts went on to use Greensill Capital's Earnd app. In 2020, a few months before Greensill Capital collapsed, Cameron lobbied the government to bend the rules to allow it to receive Covid Corporate Financing Facility loans. He sent several text messages to Chancellor of the Exchequer Rishi Sunak, who ultimately declined to help Greensill; Cameron also held ten virtual meetings with permanent secretaries Tom Scholar and Charles Roxburgh to try to obtain money for Greensill. The government-owned British Business Bank lent Greensill up to £400m through a different scheme, leading to a potential £335m loss to the taxpayer. After press revelations in 2021 regarding the extent of Greensill Capital's access, a formal investigation was launched by the UK lobbying registrar to be led by Nigel Boardman, a non-executive board member of the Department for Business, Energy and Industrial Strategy.

NYU Abu Dhabi 
In January 2023, Cameron was assigned to teach politics in a three-week course at New York University Abu Dhabi. He was to lecture students on “practising politics and government in the age of disruption”, which included topics like the Ukraine war and migration crisis.

In popular culture 
Cameron made a cameo appearance in the BBC television programme Top Gear's India Special, where he tells the trio of Jeremy Clarkson, James May, and Richard Hammond to "stay away from India" after initially denying the group's request to improve economic relations with India in a letter and suggested that they mend fences with Mexico. Cameron later stated through his aides that he did not like the special that he cameoed in, and that he had the "utmost respect" for the people of India.

Cameron had a cameo in a One Direction video as part of the 2013 Comic Relief.

Cameron was portrayed by comedian Jon Culshaw in ITV's satirical sketch show Newzoids.

Cameron was portrayed by Mark Dexter in the Channel 4 television films Coalition and Brexit: The Uncivil War.

Cameron was interviewed for a BBC mini-documentary series on his Premiership in 2019, The Cameron Years.

Personal life

Family

Cameron is married to Samantha Cameron (née Sheffield), the daughter of Sir Reginald Sheffield, 8th Baronet, and Annabel Lucy Veronica Jones (later Viscountess Astor). A Marlborough College school friend of Cameron's sister Clare, Samantha accepted Clare's invitation to accompany the Cameron family on holiday in Tuscany, Italy, after graduating from Bristol School of Creative Arts. It was then David and Samantha's romance started. They were married in 1996.

The Camerons have had four children. Their first, Ivan Reginald Ian, was born on 8 April 2002 in Hammersmith and Fulham, London, with a rare combination of cerebral palsy and a form of severe epilepsy called Ohtahara syndrome, requiring round-the-clock care. Recalling the receipt of this news, Cameron was quoted as saying: "The news hits you like a freight train ... You are depressed for a while because you are grieving for the difference between your hopes and the reality. But then you get over that, because he's wonderful." Ivan was cared for at the specialist NHS Cheyne Day Centre in West London, which closed shortly after he left it. Ivan died at St Mary's Hospital, Paddington, London, on 25 February 2009, aged six.

The Camerons have two daughters, Nancy Gwen (born 2004) and Florence Rose Endellion (born 2010), and a son, Arthur Elwen (born 2006). Cameron took paternity leave when Arthur was born, and this decision received broad coverage. It was also stated that Cameron would be taking paternity leave after his second daughter was born. She was born at the Royal Cornwall Hospital on 24 August 2010, three weeks prematurely, while the family was on holiday in Cornwall. Her third given name, Endellion, is taken from the village of St Endellion near where the Camerons were holidaying.

In early May 2008, the Camerons decided to enrol their daughter Nancy at a state primary school. For three years before that, they had been attending its associated church, St Mary Abbots, near the Cameron family home in North Kensington. Cameron's constituency home is in Dean, Oxfordshire, and the Camerons have been described as key members of the Chipping Norton set.

On 8 September 2010, it was announced that Cameron would miss Prime Minister's Questions in order to fly to southern France to see his father, Ian Cameron, who had had a stroke with coronary complications. Later that day, his father died. On 17 September 2010, Cameron attended a private ceremony for the funeral of his father in Berkshire, which prevented him from hearing the address of Pope Benedict XVI in Westminster Hall, an occasion he would otherwise have attended.

Inheritance and family wealth
In October 2010, David Cameron inherited £300,000 from his father's estate. Ian Cameron, who had worked as a stockbroker in the City of London, used multimillion-pound investment funds based in offshore tax havens, such as Jersey, Panama City, and Geneva, to increase the family wealth. In 1982, Ian Cameron created the Panamanian Blairmore Holdings, an offshore investment fund, valued at about $20 million in 1988, "not liable to taxation on its income or capital gains", which used bearer shares until 2006.

In April 2016, following the Panama Papers financial documents leak, David Cameron faced calls to resign after it was revealed that he and his wife Samantha invested in Ian Cameron's offshore fund. He owned £31,500 of shares in the fund and sold them for a profit of £19,000 shortly before becoming prime minister in 2010, which he paid full UK tax on. David Cameron argued that the fund was set up in Panama so that people who wanted to invest in dollar-denominated shares and companies could do so, and because full UK tax was paid on all profits he made there was no impropriety. A protest was held in London in April 2016 demanding Cameron's resignation.

Leisure

Before becoming prime minister, Cameron regularly used his bicycle to commute to work. In early 2006, he was photographed cycling to work, followed by his driver in a car carrying his belongings. His Conservative Party spokesperson subsequently said that this was a regular arrangement for Cameron at the time.
Cameron is an occasional jogger and in 2009 raised funds for charities by taking part in the Oxford 5K and the Great Brook Run.

Cameron supports Aston Villa.  He is also a keen cricket fan and has appeared on Test Match Special.

Faith
At a Q&A in August 2013, Cameron described himself as a practising Christian and an active member of the Church of England. On religious faith in general he said: "I do think that organised religion can get things wrong but the Church of England and the other churches do play a very important role in society." He said he considers the Bible "a sort of handy guide" on morality. He viewed Britain as a "Christian country" and aimed to put faith back into politics.

Honours and awards 
 :
 14 December 2005: appointed to the Privy Council of the United Kingdom, giving him the honorific "The Right Honourable" for life.
 :
  6 November 2012: Special Class of the Order of King Abdulaziz.

As a former Prime Minister, Cameron, with Samantha, had a place of honour at the state funeral of Queen Elizabeth II on 19 September 2022.

Bibliography

See also 
 2016 Prime Minister's Resignation Honours
 Muscular liberalism

References

Further reading

Full biography

Books about Cameron as leader

Published works by and about
 
 David Cameron's articles at The Guardian
 David Cameron: My Legacy: What I Will Be Remembered For. CreateSpace Independent Publishing Platform 2017,  (50 p.)

Political career

Video

News coverage
 
 
 
 David Cameron collected news and commentary at The Daily Telegraph
 Brian Wheeler, The David Cameron story, BBC News, 6 December 2005

External links

 
 David Cameron official government website
 David Cameron official Conservative Party profile

 The Office of David Cameron personal website
 

|-

|-

|-

|-

|-

|-

|-

|-

 
1966 births
20th-century Anglicans
21st-century Anglicans
21st-century English male writers
21st-century English non-fiction writers
21st-century English memoirists
21st-century prime ministers of the United Kingdom
Alumni of Brasenose College, Oxford
British monarchists
Bullingdon Club members
Carlton Television
Conservative Party (UK) MPs for English constituencies
Conservative Party prime ministers of the United Kingdom
English Anglicans
English people of German-Jewish descent
English people of Scottish descent
English people of Welsh descent
HuffPost bloggers
ITV people
English LGBT rights activists
Leaders of the Conservative Party (UK)
Leaders of the Opposition (United Kingdom)
Living people
Lobbying in the United Kingdom
Members of the Privy Council of the United Kingdom
People educated at Eton College
People educated at Heatherdown School
People from Marylebone
People from West Berkshire District
Political funding in the United Kingdom
Prime Ministers of the United Kingdom
UK MPs 2001–2005
UK MPs 2005–2010
UK MPs 2010–2015
UK MPs 2015–2017